Once Upon a Crime is the debut album by New York City hip hop duo the Godfathers, consisting of Kool G Rap and Necro. The album was released on November 19, 2013 under Necro's own label Psycho+Logical-Records. Two tracks from the album, "Wolf Eyes" and "Heart Attack", were released as singles.

Background
Necro and Kool G Rap first announced their Godfathers project and collaboration in 2011 and released two mix CDs consisting of fifty previously released songs from the pair, The Pre-Kill Volume I in November 2011 and then The Pre-Kill Volume II in July 2012. They had initially announced that their first official album would be released in the first half of 2012, but Once Upon a Crime would not launch until November 2013. The album was executive produced by Necro and Domingo.

Reception
Once Upon a Crime received generally mixed to positive reviews from music critics. Jay Balfour at HipHopDX noted, "The casual fan or those keeping up with G Rap's late career output might find a handful of songs worth mining, but without a previous investment in the over-the-top style, listening through is a test of endurance."

Track listing
All songs produced by Necro, except track #11 co-produced by Kool G Rap.

References

External links
 Once Upon a Crime at Discogs

2013 albums
Psycho+Logical-Records albums
Albums produced by Domingo (producer)
Necro (rapper) albums
Kool G Rap albums
The Godfathers (rap duo) albums